Frederick William Porter (19 October 1821 - 17 November 1901) was a British/Irish architect.

Frederick William Porter was born in Rathmines, Dublin, on 19 October 1821, the second son of William Edward Porter (1783-1859) and his wife Anne (née Coultate).

Porter was a pupil of Lewis Vulliamy.

In 1865, he designed the Union Bank of London building in Chancery Lane, of which an illustration appeared in The Builder on 24 February 1866.

In 1875, St James' Church, Islington, designed by Porter, was opened.

Personal life
His son Horace Porter (1861-1918) was also an architect.

References

1821 births
1901 deaths
Architects from Dublin (city)